The Collective Soul and Unconscious: Chapter One (stylized in lower-case) is the second extended play by the South Korean girl group Billlie. It was released on February 23, 2022 by Mystic Story and distributed by Kakao Entertainment. The physical album is available in two versions as "Soul" and "Unconscious".The EP is produced by Han Peacedelic Jungsu and it is primarily a pop record with influences of bass house, jazz, alternative R&B, post-trip hop and synth-pop.

Background and release 
On January 27, 2022, Mystic Story confirmed all the reports that Billlie is preparing for a new and a speedy release, slated for a late-February release. A teaser posted on February 11 revealed the EP and the lead single "GingaMingaYo" would be released on February 23. The album was officially released on 23 February. It was scheduled to have a showcase on the day of the release but since 3 members, namely Siyoon, Haram, and Tsuki was diagnosed with COVID-19, the showcase was cancelled.

Composition 
The group's sophomore album is primarily a pop record with influences of bass house, jazz, alternative R&B, post-trip hop and synth-pop. The EP is 15 minutes and 13 seconds and features 5 songs. Many critics observed that has a lighter, more whimsical feel with catchy deep house beats rather than their debut EP The Billage of Perception: Chapter One. One of the members of the group, Suhyeon, stated to The Korea Times that "In our debut track, we mostly focused on revealing our everyday life in a mysterious village," Suhyeon explained. "In our second release 'Snowy Night' that dropped in December, we offered a glimpse into our unconscious world. And this time, we will have people explore the deeper layers of our unconsciousness."

Songs 
The lead single "GingaMingaYo (The Strange World)" was described as "containing the questions and emotions that he asks himself during the process of becoming an adult." The music video was directed by Zanybros. "GingaMingaYo" was composed in the key of B minor, with a tempo of 122 beats per minute. Other tracks include, "a sign ~ anonymous" , broken beat style Jazz track, "overlap (1/1)" , an alternative R&B track, "Moon Palace" (stylized as  M◐◑N palace) a post-trip hop track and "Believe" , a synth-pop track.

Commercial performance 
The Collective Soul and Unconscious: Chapter One debuted at number 5 on Gaon Album Chart in the chart issue dated February 20–26, 2022; on the monthly chart, the album debuted at number 20 in the chart issue for February 2022 with 29,966 copies sold. It has then sold 88,763 copies. It peaked at number eighteen on Japanese Oricon Weekly Album Charts, selling 2,681 copies in Japan.

Track listing 

Notes
 "Moon Palace" is stylized as "M◐◑N palace".

Charts

Weekly charts

Monthly charts

Accolades

Certification and sales

The Collective Soul and Unconscious: Chapter One Original Soundtrack from "What Is Your B?" 

The Collective Soul and Unconscious: Chapter One Original Soundtrack from "What Is Your B?" is the first soundtrack album by Billlie. It was released on March 1, 2022, with "A Sign ~ Overture to Billlie" serving as the album's lead single.

The album includes the original soundtracks for the documentary film "What Is Your B?" that accompanied the EP The Collective Soul and Unconscious: Chapter One. The jazz, alternative, R&B, trip-hop, synth pop album was made available for download and streaming.

Track listing 

Notes

 "Flipping a Coin" is stylized as "flipp!ng a coin".
 "Everybody's Got a Secret" is stylized as "everybody's got a $ECRET"
 "Moon in the Fog" is stylized as "M◐◑N in the fog"

Credits and personnel 
Credits adapted from NetEase Music

Recording and management

 Recorded and digitally edited at 153/Joombas Studio (Seoul, South Korea)
 Mixed at Studio89 and Glabudio Studio (Seoul, South Korea)
 Published by 153/Joombas Publishing, EKKO Music Rights (CTGA), EKKO Music Rights Europe (CTGA), JYP Publishing (KOMCA) and NuVibe Music

Personnel

 Billlie – writing , vocals, background vocals 
 Hyuk Shin (153/Joombas) – music 
 Ashley Alisha (153/Joombas) – music 
 Le'mon (153/Joomba) – writing , music 
 Jo Jung-seo – writing 
 Jang Ji-eun – writing 
 Lim Kwang-kyun – writing 
 16 – writing 
 MRey (153/Joombas) – arrangement and music 
 minGtion – music and arrangement 
 Mayu Wakisaka – music 
 Theresia Svensson – music 
 Matilda Frommegard – music  
 Farida Benounis – music 
 Rasmus Thallaug – music 
 Lee Woo-min "collapsedone" – music and arrangement 
 Justin Reinstein – music and arrangement 
 Mystic Story, Yoon Jong-shin, Cho Young-chul – executive production
 Han Peacedelic Jungsu – production
 Kim Jihyun – recording
 Mr.Panda - mixing
 Joe LaPorta - mixing
 Jo Junsung - mixing
 Kim Ilho - mixing
 Shin Bongwon – mixing

Visual Credits

 Hong Wonki of Zanybros - music video direction
 Shim Jihyoung of Zanybros - music video direction
 Lia Kim (1Million Dance Studio) - choreography production
 Dohee (1Million Dance Studio) - choreography
 JJ (1Million Dance Studio) - choreography
 Yeji Kim (1Million Dance Studio) - choreography
 Amy Park (1Million Dance Studio) - choreography
 Renan (1Million Dance Studio) - choreography
 Shin Sunhye of CO-OP, Park Jinho, Song Jongsuk of studio BoB – photography
 WOOK of Studio VV – cover artwork
 Ko Yoon of deep.wide – package artwork and design

Release history

References 

Billlie albums
2022 EPs
Korean-language EPs